Max Linder (1901–1948) was a Swedish art director. He designed the film sets on more than fifty productions while working in the Swedish film industry.

Selected filmography
 South of the Highway (1936)
 The Girls of Uppakra (1936)
 The Quartet That Split Up (1936)
 Sun Over Sweden (1938)
 Storm Over the Skerries (1938)
 For Better, for Worse (1938)
 We at Solglantan (1939)
 Kalle's Inn (1939)
 Bashful Anton (1940)
 A Sailor on Horseback (1940)
 Blossom Time (1940)
 Hanna in Society (1940)
 Sunny Sunberg (1941)
 Her Melody (1940)
 Lucky Young Lady (1941)
 How to Tame a Real Man (1941)
 Sun Over Klara (1942)
 The Case of Ingegerd Bremssen (1942)
 Adventurer (1942)
 Life in the Country (1943)
 Elvira Madigan (1943)
 A Girl for Me (1943)
 Blizzard (1944)
 The Green Lift (1944)
 Turn of the Century (1944)
 The People of Hemsö (1944)
 Skipper Jansson (1944)
 Tired Theodore (1945)
 The Happy Tailor (1945)
 Widower Jarl (1945)
 The Bells of the Old Town (1946)
 Brita in the Merchant's House (1946)
 The Key and the Ring (1947)
 The Loveliest Thing on Earth (1947)
 Wedding Night (1947)

References

Bibliography
 Kwiatkowski, Aleksander.  Swedish Film Classics: A Pictorial Survey of 25 Films from 1913 to 1957. Courier Dover Publications, 1983.

External links

1901 births
1948 deaths
Swedish art directors
People from Malmö